Gerald S. Rehm (March 10, 1927 – March 10, 2017) was an American politician in the state of Florida.

He was a businessman and former mayor of Dunedin, Florida. He served in the Florida House of Representatives for the 51st district from 1986 to 1990, as a Republican. Rehm also served in the Florida Senate from 1981 to 1984.

References

2017 deaths
1927 births
Republican Party members of the Florida House of Representatives